Rostovtsev is a Russian masculine surname, its feminine counterpart is Rostovtseva. It may refer to
Michael Rostovtzeff (1870–1952), Soviet historian
Mikhail Rostovtsev (actor) (1872-1948), Soviet opera singer and actor
Pavel Rostovtsev (born 1971), Russian biathlete
Yakov Rostovtsev (1803–1860), Russian military officer and statesman 

Russian-language surnames